Matthew Frank Shaheen (born June 8, 1965) is an American politician serving as a member of the Texas House of Representatives from the 66th district. Elected in the November 2014, he assumed office in January 2015.

Early life and education 
Shaheen was born in Virginia. He earned a Bachelor of Science degree in business economics from Randolph–Macon College and a Master of Arts in liberal arts from Southern Methodist University.

Career 
Shaheen worked as a business executive at Hewlett Packard Enterprise. He was also a member of the Collin County Board of Commissioners. Shaheen was elected to the Texas House of Representatives in November 2014 and assumed office in January 2015. During the 2019–2020 legislative session, Shaheen was the vice chair of the House Urban Affairs Committee. Shaheen is the founder of the Texas Freedom Caucus, a legislative caucus in the Texas House modeled after the Freedom Caucus.

During the 2016 Republican Party presidential primaries, Shaheen endorsed Senator Ted Cruz.

Shaheen was viewed as a possible candidate for the Texas Senate in 2018, but opted to seek re-election to the House instead.

Shaheen supports a ban on Democrats being given committee chairmanships as long as the Republicans hold the majority of seats in the Texas House.

Electoral history

References

External links
 Campaign website
 State legislative page

1965 births
Living people
People from Plano, Texas
Randolph–Macon College alumni
Southern Methodist University alumni
Republican Party members of the Texas House of Representatives